The International Women's Club Championship (IWCC), previously named the mobcast Cup and the Nestlé Cup for sponsorship reasons, was an international association football knockout cup competition contested by women's champion clubs. It was organised by the Japan Football Association and the Nadeshiko League. The first International Women's Club Championship took place in Japan in November 2012 with participation from four teams; Olympique Lyonnais (Europe), Canberra United (Australia), INAC Kobe Leonessa (Japan) and NTV Beleza (cup winner, Japan). The holders  are São José, who beat Arsenal Ladies 2–0 in the 2014 final.

The Nadeshiko League's senior executive announced in October 2012 that they intended to run the competition for three years and expand to include more champions, such as the South American Copa Libertadores winner. It was envisaged that International Federation of Association Football (FIFA), the sport's global governing body, would ultimately endorse the tournament as the female equivalent of the FIFA Club World Cup.

Results

Honours

Prize money
The winners earned $60,000 out of a total purse of $100,000.

See also

 FIFA Women's Club World Cup
 :pt:Torneio Internacional Interclubes de Futebol Feminino
 Women's International Champions Cup

References

External links
International women's club football (Japanese)
International Women’s Club Championship (mobcast Cup) on Women's Soccer United (English)
International Women's Club Championship  (RSSSF)

 
Women's international association football competitions
Club, Women's
Multi-national professional sports leagues